is a train station on the Sasaguri Line operated by JR Kyushu in Kasuya, Kasuya District, Fukuoka Prefecture, Japan.

Lines
The station is sometimes depicted on maps and timetables as part of the Fukuhoku Yutaka Line, of which the Sasaguri Line is a component.

Station layout 
The station consists of two side platforms serving two tracks. The station building houses a waiting area and s staffed ticket window. Access to the opposite side platform is by means of a covered footbridge. A bike shed is provided outside the station.

Management of the station has been outsourced to the JR Kyushu Tetsudou Eigyou Co., a wholly owned subsidiary of JR Kyushu specialising in station services. It staffs the ticket window which is equipped with a POS machine but without a Midori no Madoguchi facility.

Adjacent stations

History
The station was opened by Japanese National Railways (JNR) on 9 March 1987 as an additional temporary stop on the existing Sasaguri Line track. With the privatization of JNR on 1 April 1987, JR Kyushu took over control of the station and upgraded it to a full station.

Passenger statistics
In fiscal 2016, the station was used by an average of 1,374 passengers daily (boarding passengers only), and it ranked 128th among the busiest stations of JR Kyushu.

References

External links
Kadomatsu (JR Kyushu)

Railway stations in Fukuoka Prefecture
Railway stations in Japan opened in 1987